Pornnappan Pornpenpipat (born June 25, 1997), nicknamed Nene, also known by her Chinese name Zheng Naixin, is a Thai-Chinese actress and singer under Huaying Entertainment and Sony Music. She started her career when she debuted in the all female Thai idol group, MilkShake back in 2015. Nene gained her popularity after placing fifth place on the final episode of Produce Camp 2020 and debuting in the female Chinese project idol group BonBon Girls 303 back in 2020. She also appeared in the 2020 hit Thai series 2gether: The Series as Air.

Career

2013–2019: AF10, MilkShake and Debut as an Actress

In 2013, Nene competed in True Academy Fantasia 10 (AF10) as the youngest contestant and finished in 12th place in the final episode. 

On November 8, 2015, Nene started her career when she debuted as a member of the all female Thai idol group MilkShake managed by GMM Grammy and released the first digital single "SHARE" with the group. In the same year, she served as a radio DJ for Channel 93 "Talk Talk". In 2016, MilkShake released their second single "JOH", then disbanded after.

In 2017, she came to China and participated in the music culture program Sing the Chinese, and sang the song "I Don't Want to Say". In the same year, the urban romance film "The Doll (宅男长成记之人偶初恋)" began shooting, in where she played as a physical doll. 

In August 19 of the same year, she made her acting debut in Thailand with the romantic comedy series, Teenage Mom: The Series under GMMTV. On April 20, 2018, she played as Christine, one of the main roles in the Vietnamese Comedy Action Film "Lat Mat 3: Ba Chang Khuyet".

On June 28, 2019, the Chinese urban fantasy romance drama "Nice to Meet UFO " co-starring Jack Jarupong as Xie Chen Xi and Zhu Yiwen as Gu Liu Nian was released. In the play, Nene played the little alien named  "Xuan" who lived in the body of Qin, a young star on the 18th-tier star, thus officially debuted in China as an actress.

2020–present: Produce Camp 2020, BonBon Girls 303, Sony Music 
In 2020, she starred in the romantic drama 2gether: The Series, in which she played Air, the senior of the music club . In April, using the stage name Zheng Naixin, Nene participated in the Tencent Video's Chinese girl group reality competition show, Produce Camp 2020. During the first episode of the show, she served as one of the three participant with strongest vocal powers. She then participated in the singing of Produce Camp 2020's theme song, "You Are Everything To Me". In July 4, she placed fifth in the Finals of Produce Camp 2020 and later debuted in the all-female Chinese idol group BonBon Girls 303. In July 12 of the same year, the Thai horror TV series "Long Khong: The Art of the Devil" was released, in which she played Aya. In August 11, BonBon Girls 303's first EP, "The Law of Hard Candy" was released.

In January 2021, she joined the 2021 edition of the variety show Produce Camp by Tencent Video as an international assistant mentor. In March 10 2021, she participated in the first martial arts office business experience reality show "She Fighter" produced by Tencent Video. In July 14 of the same year, she released the single "A Dream".

In July 4, 2022, the group BonBon Girls 303 announced its official disbandment.  Shortly after, on the 12th day of the same month, She joined Sony Music China and released its first solo album debut song "Promise". In July, it was announced that she would participate in Bilibili Forward. On August 21, she participated in the third stage of Douyin's Masked Dance King. On November 23, it was announced that she will participate in the new Chinese drama "Confess Your Love", where she played Lin Chen/Lin Wen. In December, she participated in the 2022 Weibo Hip-hop Competition and served as the star promoter of the event. In December 14, it was announced that Nene will be one fo the guests for Chaoyang Singing Center.

Early life and education 
Nene was born in the city of Bangkok in Thailand on June 25, 1997. She finished her education in King Mongkut's University of Technology North Bangkok. Her father is Thai-Chinese, while her mother is Thai of Chinese descent.

Works

Discography

Singles

Soundtrack Appearances

Radio shows

Filmography

Films

Series

TV shows

Endorsements

Ambassadorship
China-Thailand Cultural Ambassador (2022)
2022 Thailand Customs Festival China-Thailand Cultural Exchange Ambassador (2022)

References

External links 
 
 
 

Reality show winners
1997 births
Living people
People from Bangkok
Musicians from Bangkok
Produce 101 (Chinese TV series) contestants
Thai expatriates in China